Mahmut Taylan Kandemir is a professor in the School of Electrical Engineering and Computer Science at Penn State University. He is a member of the Microsystems Design Lab. Dr. Kandemir's research interests are in optimizing compilers, runtime systems, mobile systems, embedded systems, I/O and high performance storage, non volatile processors and memory, and latest trends in public cloud services. He is the author of more than 150 journal publications and over 650 conference/workshop papers in these areas. He graduated 32 Ph.D. and 20 masters students so far, and is currently advising/coadvising 15 Ph.D. students and 5 masters students. He served in the program committees of 40 conferences and workshops. He is a member of Hall of Fame for conferences such as MICRO, ISCA and HPCA . His research is/was funded by NSF, DOE, DARPA, SRC, Intel and Microsoft. He is a recipient of NSF Career Award and the Penn State Premier Research Award. He is a Fellow of IEEE. Between 2008-2012 and 2017, he served as the Graduate Coordinator of the Computer Science and Engineering Department at Penn State. He was named a Fellow of the Institute of Electrical and Engineers (IEEE) in 2016 for his contributions to compiler support for performance and energy optimization of computer architectures.

References 

Fellow Members of the IEEE
Living people
Year of birth missing (living people)
American electrical engineers